The Grammy Award for Best Latin Jazz Album is an award presented at the Grammy Awards, a ceremony that was established in 1958 and originally called the Gramophone Awards, to recording artists for quality works (songs or albums) in the Latin jazz music genre. Honors in several categories are presented at the ceremony annually by the National Academy of Recording Arts and Sciences of the United States to "honor artistic achievement, technical proficiency and overall excellence in the recording industry, without regard to album sales or chart position".

Originally called the Grammy Award for Best Latin Jazz Performance, the award was first presented to Arturo Sandoval in 1995. The name of the category was changed to Best Latin Jazz Album in 2001, the same year producers, engineers, and/or mixers associated with the winning work became award recipients in addition to the recording artists. According to the category description guide for the 52nd Grammy Awards, the award is presented to "vocal or instrumental albums containing at least 51% playing time of newly recorded material", with the intent to recognize the "blending" of jazz music with Argentinian, Brazilian, Iberian-American, and Latin tango music. Beginning in 1998, members of the Latin Academy of Recording Arts & Sciences (LARAS) are eligible to vote in the Latin categories including Best Latin Jazz Album.

As of 2020, Chucho Valdés has the most wins in this category, with four. Paquito D'Rivera has won three, and two-time recipients include Sandoval, Charlie Haden, and Eddie Palmieri (once as a collaboration called The Brian Lynch/Eddie Palmieri Project). Since its inception, the award has been presented to musicians or groups originating from Brazil, Cuba, the Dominican Republic, and the United States. Ray Barretto and Wayne Wallace hold the record for the most nominations without a win, with four.

The award was not presented in 2012 as part of a major overhaul of Grammy categories; Latin jazz recordings were shifted to either the Best Jazz Instrumental Album or Best Jazz Vocal Album categories. However following protests and a lawsuit made by Latin jazz musicians, the Recording Academy announced it would be bringing back the category for the 55th Grammy Awards.

Recipients

 Each year is linked to the article about the Grammy Awards held that year.

See also

 Afro-Cuban jazz
 Billboard Latin Music Award for Latin Jazz Album of the Year
 Latin Grammy Award for Best Latin Jazz/Jazz Album
 List of Grammy Award categories
 Tango (dance)

References

General
  Note: User must select the "Jazz" category as the genre under the search feature.

Specific

 
1995 establishments in the United States
Album awards
Awards established in 1995
Latin Jazz
Latin Jazz Album
Jazz Album